Curt Wittenberg is an American biologist at Scripps Research Institute and an Elected Fellow of the American Association for the Advancement of Science.

References

Year of birth missing (living people)
Living people
Fellows of the American Association for the Advancement of Science
University of California, Santa Barbara alumni
21st-century American biologists